Jean-Marc Bustamante (born 1952 in Toulouse) is a French artist, painter, sculptor and photographer. He is a noted conceptual and installation artist and has incorporated ornamental design and architectural space in his works.

Career

Bustamante first entered the world of art in the mid-70s, when he was employed as an assistant by the photographer William Klein.

In 1978 he began to produce huge color photographs landscapes near Barcelona. Entitled Tableaux, they looked like oil paintings with wooden frames. Penelope Curtis wrote in an exhibition catalogue of 2010: "Nothing is happening; there is no timetable, there is no narrative, other than what is in front of our eyes." Examples of these pioneering works are owned by the Metropolitan Museum in New York, Barcelona’s Museum of  Contemporary  Art (MACBA) and the Centre Pompidou in Paris.

From the beginning of the 80s Bustamante was merging different media, producing work that straddled photography, sculpture and painting. In 1983 he met the artist Bernard Bazile and began a three-year collaboration during which the pair created conceptual works bearing the joint signature BazileBustamante.

From 1986 Bustamante worked on his own and became heavily involved in exploring the boundaries between photography and sculpture. The results were shown in a personal exhibition at the Musée d’Art Moderne de la Ville de Paris in 1990 (Paysages Intérieurs). In 2010 Emma Dexter noted the importance of Bustamante’s titles: "Call-ing his photographs Tableaux and his paintings Panorama suggests that Bustamante encourages a playful ambiguity and elusiveness in his practice."

In 1987 he was invited to take part in the VIII Documenta exhibition in Kassel in Germany, and again in 1992 and 1997. In 1994 the Kröller-Müller museum and sculpture park in the Netherlands commissioned an exhibit for its famous pavilion designed by the modernist architect Gerrit Rietveld.

In the 1990s Bustamante experimented with a series of paintings on thick, sculptural sheets of silk-screened Plexiglas fastened to the wall with steel brackets. The results were shown at a solo exhibition at the Tate Gallery in London in 1998 (title: Something is Missing).

In 2003 he was appointed to represent France at the 50th Venice Biennale. He exhibited a huge sculpture at the center of the French Pavilion and some large photographic portraits resembling traditional painted portraits. (1)

In 2006 the museum director Eckhard Schneider organized a solo exhibition entitled Beautifuldays at the Bregenz Kunsthaus in Austria. Bustamante’s works occupied the four floors of the museum and a lighting installation highlighted the external structure of the building.

In 2007 he jointly exhibited with the US artist Ed Ruscha at the Musée d’Art Moderne et Contemporaine in Strasbourg. (2)

In 2011 he had a solo exhibition in Villa Medici in Rome curated by Eric de Chassey, and presented an extensive show of his work entitled Dead Calm, both at The Fruitmarket Gallery in Edinburgh and at the same time at the Henry Moore Institute in Leeds. In the catalogue Emma Dexter wrote: "Bustamante’s approach seeks to ex-plore the gaps, ambiguities and correspondences between media, testing the thinness or robustness of the delineation of each medium, aiming always at their redefinition and reinvention."

In September 2015 he was appointed director of the École nationale supérieure des Beaux-Arts in Paris.

On 7 December 2016 Jean-Marc Bustamante was elected member of the Académie des Beaux-Arts in Paris, taking the place of the painter Zao Wou-Ki (1920–2013).

Teaching

From 1990 to 1995 Jean-Marc Bustamante taught in the Rijksakademie van Beeldende Kunsten in Amsterdam.

From 1996 taught at the École nationale supérieure des Beaux-Arts in Paris.

From 2009 to 2015 he was head of the painting class at the Akademie der Bildenden Künste in Munich.

Galleries
Jean-Marc Bustamante is represented by:
Galeria Juana de Aizpuru, http://juanadeaizpuru.es
Galerie Bärbel Grässlin, http://galerie-graesslin.de
Galerie Thaddaeus Ropac, http://www.ropac.net

Personal life
Jean Marc Bustamante has three daughters: Elsa, Adriana and Gabrielle.

(1)	Jean-Pierre Criqui in the exhibition catalogue (Bustamante, Gallimard, 2003)
(2) (MAMCS : L’horizon chimérique: Ed Ruscha and Jean-Marc Bustamante).

Important collections

 Essl Museum, Klosterneuburg, Austria
 SMAK Stedelijk Museum voor Actuele Kunst, Gent, Belgium
 CAPC - Musée d'art contemporain, Bordeaux, France
 FRAC - Nord-Pas de Calais, Dunkerque, France
 Musée d'Art Contemporain Lyon, Lyon, France
 FRAC - Provence-Alpes-Côte d’Azur, Marseille, France
 FRAC - Languedoc-Roussilon, Montpellier, France
 Fondation Cartier pour l'art contemporain, Paris, France
 Colección D.O.P., Paris, France
 FRAC - Ile-de-France Le Plateau, Paris? France
 Centre Pompidou - Musée d´Art Contemporain, Paris, France
 Musée d'Art moderne de Saint-Etienne, Saint-Etienne, France
 FRAC - Haute-Normandie, Sotteville-lès-Rouen, France
 Musée d'Art Moderne et Contemporain (MAMCS), Strasbourg, France
 Maison de la Photographie, Toulon, France
 Huis Marseille stichting voor fotografie, Amsterdam, Netherlands
 Kröller-Müller museum, Otterlo, Netherlands
 Moderna Galerija - Ljubljana, Ljubljana, Slovenia
 Cal Cego - Colleccion de Arte Contemporaneo, Barcelona, Spain
 Museu d´Art Contemporani de Barcelona - MACBA, Barcelona, Spain
 Centro de Artes Visuales Helga de Alvear, Cáceres, Spain
 Museo Nacional Centro de Arte Reina Sofía MNCARS, Madrid, Spain
 Fundación D.O.P., Madrid, Spain
 Kunsthalle Bern, Bern, Switzerland
 Kunsthaus Zürich, Zurich, Switzerland
 Migros Museum für Gegenwartskunst, Zurich, Switzerland
 Tate Britain, London (England), United Kingdom
 Albright-Knox Art Gallery, Buffalo, NY, USA
 The Metropolitan Museum of Art, New York City, NY, USA

References
 Union List of Artists Names, s.v. "Bustamante, Jean-Marc", cited 7 February 2006
  Jean-Marc Bustamante

1952 births
Living people
Artists from Toulouse
French conceptual artists
French photographers
20th-century French sculptors
20th-century French male artists
French male sculptors
Academic staff of the École des Beaux-Arts
French contemporary artists
Chevaliers of the Légion d'honneur
Commandeurs of the Ordre des Arts et des Lettres